Zachari Logan (born 1980) is a Canadian visual artist working in drawing, ceramics and related installation practices. Logan is known internationally for his monumentally-scaled pastel drawings and intimate blue and red pencil drawings on Mylar depicting flora, wildlife and figures. His work intersects themes of selfhood, sexuality, queerness and memory with a focus on human relationships with the natural world. He often makes historical art references to artists and particular works of art, most notably the 18th century artist Mary Delany, 16th century Italian painter Giuseppe Arcimboldo and 15th century Unicorn Tapestries. Logan was born and raised in Saskatoon, Saskatchewan and currently resides in Regina, Saskatchewan.

Artist in residence 
Logan was an artist in Residence at the Tom Thomson Shack on commission by the McMichael Canadian Art Collection. From June 26 to July 8, 2017, Logan worked on-site to create a site-specific installation for permanent display. In addition, he was also commissioned to create a drawing inspired by Thomson that would remain in McMichael's permanent collection. The result, titled, Witness, the Near Shore from Eunuch Tapestries (for Tom), was included in a subsequent exhibition at MCAC titled, Passion Over Reason: Tom Thomson and Joyce Weiland.

Solo and two-person exhibitions

Group exhibitions

Public collections 

21c Museum Hotels

Art Gallery of Ontario

Leslie-Lohman Museum

National Gallery of Canada

McMichael Canadian Art Collection

Saskatchewan Arts Board

University of British Columbia

University of Regina

University of Saskatchewan

University of Tampa

York University

References 

1980 births
Living people
Artists from Regina, Saskatchewan
Artists from Saskatoon
Canadian ceramists
Canadian installation artists
Canadian male artists
Canadian LGBT artists
21st-century Canadian artists
21st-century Canadian male artists
21st-century Canadian LGBT people